"No Strings" is the debut single by British singer-songwriter Chlöe Howl. It was released on 23 August 2013, through Sony Music Entertainment. The song entered the UK Singles Chart at number 176 on 1 September 2013. The song has peaked at number 182 on the French Singles Chart. The song was written by Chlöe Howl and Francis White. It was used as part of the Kick-Ass 2 movie soundtrack.

Music video
A music video to accompany the release of "No Strings" was first released onto YouTube on 16 June 2013 at a total length of three minutes and fifty-six seconds.

Track listing

Charts

Release history

References

2013 songs
2013 debut singles
Chlöe Howl songs
Sony Music UK singles